Lehesten is a town in the Thuringian Forest, 20 km southeast of Saalfeld.

World War II V-2 facility
After an August 1944  explosion at the Redl-Zipf V-2 liquid oxygen plant at Schlier stopped production, the third V-2 liquid oxygen plant (5000 tons/month) was built at a slate quarry at Lehesten at the Thuringia-Bavarian border near Nordhausen (acceptance testing of combustion chamber was also performed at the Lehesten plant).  Dr Martin Schilling (the head of testing at Peenemünde) located the Lehesten site, and 400 engineers were moved from Peenemünde to Lehesten, which eventually had 16 liquid oxygen production plants.

References 

Towns in Thuringia
V-weapon subterranea
Saalfeld-Rudolstadt
V-2 missile launch sites